Wilbur Neil "Sparky" Stalcup (February 13, 1910 – April 21, 1972) was an American basketball coach and college athletics administrator.  He served as the head basketball coach at Northwest Missouri State Teacher's College—now known as Northwest Missouri State University—from 1933 to 1943 and the University of Missouri from 1946 to 1962, compiling a career college basketball record of 332–236. Stalcup was also the athletic director at Missouri from 1971 until his death in 1972.

Early life and playing career
Stalcup grew up in Oregon, Missouri, where he played for the 1928 team that won the Missouri State High School championship at a time when there were no size divisions for high school basketball. The Oregon team made it to the quarterfinals of the National Interscholastic Basketball Tournament at the University of Chicago. During the run Oregon did not have a gymnasium and practiced on an outdoor court and occasionally inside a Methodist church. There were only 10 people from the school body of 100 who played.

Stalcup attended Northwest Missouri State Teacher's College and played for Henry Iba. He was a member of Iba's 1932 team that lost a title game in the Amateur Athletic Union national championship.

Coaching career
After graduating from Northwest Missouri State in 1932, Stalcup began his coaching career that fall as head coach at Jackson High School in Jackson, Missouri.

Northwest Missouri State
Following one year at Jackson High School, Stalcup returned to Northwest Missouri State to succeed Iba as head basketball coach. With a 138–57 record, Stalcup is second only to Iba in won-loss percentage. His only Missouri Intercollegiate Athletic Association was in 1939–40 when his team was 17–0 in conference play and 20–1 overall. His teams had winning records in eight of his nine seasons.

Missouri
Following a hiatus on basketball during World War II, Stalcup moved to Missouri. He compiled a 194–179 record at Missouri. His team won no conference championships, although they did win two Big Seven Holiday Tournaments. Among his players was Norm Stewart. He had the most wins in the school history until Stewart eclipsed him. He was president of the National Association of Basketball Coaches in 1961–62. He was color commentator on basketball broadcasts after leaving coaching and was the athletic director at the university when he died. The Stalcup Room in the Mizzou Arena is named for him.

Head coaching record

College basketball

References

External links
 

1910 births
1972 deaths
American men's basketball players
Basketball coaches from Missouri
Basketball players from Missouri
High school basketball coaches in Missouri
High school football coaches in Missouri
Northwest Missouri State Bearcats football players
Northwest Missouri State Bearcats men's basketball coaches
Northwest Missouri State Bearcats men's basketball players
Missouri Tigers athletic directors
Missouri Tigers men's basketball coaches
People from Holt County, Missouri
Players of American football from Missouri